The Webb Dock railway line is a former railway line in Melbourne, Victoria, Australia.

History
On 27 February 1986, the Webb Dock line was opened by Minister for Transport Tom Roper. It was built as a freight line to service the Webb Dock container port in Melbourne, with provision for the line to be converted to dual gauge. This attracted some controversy, as the line used 1,600 mm broad gauge, which was criticised by ANL, claiming that it was costing the shipping industry millions of dollars per year (ANL contributed to the building of the line, and used dual gauge within its area of the dock).

The line commenced near Spencer Street station, passing through what is now Docklands Stadium, before crossing the Yarra River via a bridge and then running west, parallel to Lorimer Street. It turned south at Todd Road, before turning west, parallel to Wharf Road, and beneath the West Gate Bridge, to Webb Dock.

After being opened, the line spent months with few (if any) trains using it, reportedly due to a clerk's dispute and shunters strike. By July 1986, trains were running on a regular schedule most nights.

It was last used in 1992 and formally closed on 14 June 1996 as part of the construction of the Docklands Stadium. The bridge over the Yarra River was converted to a footbridge. Much of the line west of the Bolte Bridge remains in situ.

Earlier plans for the line included running it via the Port Melbourne beachfront. However, after opposition from local residents, the plans were dropped.

The Victorian Freight Plan calls for a freight link to Webb Dock.

References

External links
Weston Langford gallery
Wongm's Gallery

Closed Melbourne railway lines
Railway lines opened in 1986
Railway lines closed in 1996
5 ft 3 in gauge railways in Australia
1986 establishments in Australia
1996 disestablishments in Australia